The following are lists of the highest-grossing domestic films in South Korea, by receipts and the number of tickets nationwide.

Domestic films by admissions
This is listed by the tickets sold nationwide, as of December 9, 2022, according to the Korean Film Council (KOFIC).
However, information on KOFIC was accrued since 2004, making some films that released before 2004 either not included or not accurate regarding number of admissions. Number of admissions for films that released before 2004 was collected from trusted articles or news.

Foreign films by admissions
Foreign films are listed by the tickets sold nationwide, as of December 9, 2022.

Domestic films by gross

This is a list of box office gross of domestic films in South Korea (adjusted for inflation) from 2004 to July 7, 2022, in South Korean won and US dollar according to the Korean Film Council.

Highest grossing films by year

The highest grossing films of each year, annually.

References

External links 
 Korean Film Council website

South Korea
South Korea film-related lists